Borschovsky is a village council territory located in the Dobrush District of Gomel in the country of Belarus.

Settlements
Borschovsky contains one settlement:
 Borshchovka

Notable residents 
 Cimoch Vostrykaǔ (in Belarusian Цімох Вострыкаў) (1922 - 2007), member of the anti-Soviet resistance, representative of the Rada of the Belarusian Democratic Republic, a Gulag prisoner

References 

Gomel District